Loft Story refers to the French adaptation of the reality TV show Big Brother:

 Loft Story (Canadian TV series), in Quebec, Canada
 Loft Story (French TV series), in France